C&R may refer to:

Constable & Robinson, a UK independent book and ebook publisher
Curio and Relic, a type of Federal Firearms License
Cops and Robbers, a chase game
Lynx C&R reconnaissance vehicle
Compliance and Robustness, the legal structure or regime underlying a Digital Rights Management (DRM) system
Communities and Residents, formerly Citizens & Ratepayers, a political group in Auckland, New Zealand
Catch and release, a practice within recreational fishing intended as a technique of conservation
Bureau of Construction and Repair, a department of the US Navy
 Cherry and Ritz Cheritz, company who made the otome game Mystic messenger
C&R Wise AI Limited, an AI company

See also 
CNR (disambiguation)
Cops and Robbers (disambiguation)